is a Japanese voice actor.

Voice roles

Anime
R.O.D The TV (2003) (John Smith)
Kurama in Elfen Lied
Rulef and Kotokeil in Banner of the Stars
Takehiko Aoki in Big Windup!
Parano in Galerians: Ash
Silvio in Absolute Obedience
Hoshi no Kirby (Whispy Woods, Gus)
Hiroshi Fumihiro in Initial D
Graneel in Flash Hiders

Video games
Street Fighter Zero (Dan Hibiki)
Street Fighter Zero 2 (Dan Hibiki)
Super Puzzle Fighter II Turbo (Dan Hibiki)
Star Gladiator  (Vector and the announcer)Red Earth (Hydron, Gigi)Street Fighter EX (Allen Snider, Garuda)Marvel Super Heroes vs. Street Fighter (Dan Hibiki)Mega Man X4 (Jet Stingray)Super Gem Fighter Mini Mix (Dan Hibiki)Street Fighter Zero 3 (Dan Hibiki)Street Fighter EX2 (Garuda)Fighting Layer (Allen Snider)Marvel vs. Capcom 2: New Age of Heroes (Dan Hibiki)Street Fighter EX3 (Garuda)Capcom vs. SNK: Millennium Fight 2000 (Dan Hibiki)Capcom vs. SNK 2 (Dan Hibiki)Shinobi (Homura)SNK vs. Capcom: SVC Chaos (Dan Hibiki)Capcom Fighting Jam (Hydron)Samurai Western (Rando Kiryu) (English/Japanese voices)Tales of the Abyss (Lorelei, Ginji, Aslan Frings)Soul Nomad & the World Eaters (Lobo)
unknown date
 The Legend of Zelda: The Wind Waker 
The Legend of Zelda: Breath of the Wild

Drama CDs
 Rock'n Baseball (Fubuki Haneda)

Tokusatsu Roles
 RR Rii & ZokuBlue in Gekisou Sentai Carranger
 Magnet Ninja Jishakkumo in Ninpuu Sentai Hurricaneger
 Sukekonoian Mashu in Tokusou Sentai Dekaranger

Dubbing
Live-actionMonk (Jack Whitman (Nick Offerman))Ocean's Trilogy (Rusty Ryan (Brad Pitt))Thirteen (Luke (Kip Pardue))WishboneAnimationDora the Explorer (Miguel Márquez)Handy Manny (Manuel Esteviez "Manny" Garcia)I Got a Rocket (Professor Quigley Q)The Prince of Egypt (Aaron)WordWorld'' (Duck)

References

External links
 
 
 

1964 births
Living people
Japanese male voice actors
Male voice actors from Saitama Prefecture
20th-century Japanese male actors
21st-century Japanese male actors
Arts Vision voice actors